The Eighteenth Angel is a 1997 American horror-thriller film, starring Christopher McDonald, Rachael Leigh Cook, Stanley Tucci, Wendy Crewson, and Maximilian Schell. It was directed by William Bindley and written by David Seltzer.

Plot

A prophecy claims that the return of Satan will be precipitated by the arrival of eighteen physically perfect beings. To make the prophecy come true a secret sect of monks join an obsessed geneticist to artificially create the perfect specimens.

Hugh Stanton and his daughter Lucy have lost his wife and her mother. This after having had a brief meeting with a mysterious Etruscan man. To knowledge only one rather poor picture of this man exists.
The father decides to move from America to Rome, and together with his daughter they settle down in the former Etruscan areas north of the Eternal City. The girl hasn't much to do while the father is at work or commutes. The girl then begins to explore the surroundings and despite of local warnings especially an old monastery. Or what ever the old building might have been even before the rise of the Romans. As it turns out, a scientist who in America has performed unethical experiments on corpses, and hence has been fired at home, now works with something new in the old building. And it also turns out, he is hired by the mysterious man, who even might have killed the girl's mother, just in order to trick the father and daughter into the ancient land of the Etruscans. In the old building, seventeen dead girls, young when they died, are brain dead but biologically kept alive by the scientist. The scientist has not a clue what his Etruscan employer is aiming for, he is just glad to be able to continue his very doubtful experiments. According to the Etruscan prophecy the number of eighteen special girls are required...

Cast
 Christopher McDonald as Hugh Stanton
 Rachael Leigh Cook as Lucy Stanton
 Stanley Tucci as Todd Stanton
 Wendy Crewson as Norah Stanton
 Maximilian Schell as Father Simeon

Reception

Nathan Rabin of The A.V. Club was critical of film writing that the "mixture of the Satanic and the mundane results in a number of conceits and juxtapositions generally more silly than terrifying" and that it fails "to create the atmosphere of Old Testament dread that the material so desperately needs."

References

External links
 
 
 PopMatters

1997 films
American horror films
1997 horror films
1990s English-language films
Films directed by William Bindley
1990s American films